Malabar is a town in Brevard County, Florida.  The population was 2,757 at the 2010 United States Census. It is part of the Palm Bay–Melbourne–Titusville Metropolitan Statistical Area.

Government

Malabar has a strong council form of government consisting of a five-seat Town Council (one from each of Malabar's five districts), and a mayor to serve as a figurehead and for ceremonial purposes.  The council members must reside in the district they represent; each district's registered voters vote for their respective district council seat.  Council members serve two year terms; district 1, 2, and 3 members are elected in even numbered years, and district 4 and 5 in odd numbered years.  The mayor serves a four-year term elected the same year as the US presidential election.  Town council members are subject to a three term (six year) term limit, but may run again and serve up to another six years after sitting out one term.  The mayor has a two term (8 year) term limit, and may also run again after sitting out one term.  Day-to-day operation of the Town and its finances is handled by a Town Administrator and a Town Clerk/Treasurer, both of whom report directly to the Town Council.  Public works, the fire department, (a hybrid volunteer/paid professional department) report to the Town Administrator, and the clerk's office reports to the Town Clerk/Treasurer.  There are several advisory boards authorized by the town charter who advise and report to the Town Council.  
In 2007, the town had a taxable real estate base of $282.32 million.  Malabar currently and historically has the lowest property tax rates of any area of Brevard County, including unincorporated areas of the county. In Early 2019, the Town Council voted unanimously to designate the Town as a Sandhill Crane Sanctuary, affording the birds extra attention to protect them within the Town Borders.  It also designated the Sandhill Crane the official Town Bird. Town Resolution 08-2018, May 20, 2019.

Demographics 

As of the census of 2000, there were 2,622 people, 1,033 households, and 757 families residing in the town. The racial makeup of the town was 93.48% White, 2.78% African American, 0.53% Native American, 1.14% Asian, 0.11% Pacific Islander, 0.34% from other races, and 1.60% from two or more races. Hispanic or Latino of any race were 2.63% of the population.

There were 1,033 households, out of which 26.9% had children under the age of 18 living with them, 63.5% were married couples living together, 6.8% had a female householder with no husband present, and 26.7% were non-families. 21.3% of all households were made up of individuals, and 8.7% had someone living alone who was 65 years of age or older. The average household size was 2.53 and the average family size was 2.95.

In the town, the population was spread out, with 22.4% under the age of 18, 5.8% from 18 to 24, 25.3% from 25 to 44, 30.9% from 45 to 64, and 15.6% who were 65 years of age or older. The median age was 44 years. For every 100 females, there were 105.5 males. For every 100 females age 18 and over, there were 100.1 males.

The median income for a household in the town was $49,674, and the median income for a family was $62,321. Males had a median income of $37,050 versus $23,125 for females. The per capita income for the town was $22,502. About 7.5% of families and 10.7% of the population were below the poverty line, including 5.5% of those under age 18 and 4.2% of those age 65 or over.

Geography

Climate

Main roads

Malabar Road (Florida State Road 514) 

This route is the way to go to Palm Bay and surrounding.

Weber Road 

This route is the way to go to Grant-Valkaria, Florida.

Corey Road 

This is another route to go to Grant-Valkaria, Florida.

Atz Road 

This road connects from west of Weber Road through Corey Road and on to LaCourt Lane.

Hall Road 

This road connects from west of Weber Road through Corey Road and on to Marie Street.

References

External links

 

Towns in Brevard County, Florida
Populated places established in 1962
Towns in Florida
Populated places on the Intracoastal Waterway in Florida